Shaun MacDonald (born 20 October 1996) is an English professional footballer who plays for Cheltenham Town, as a goalkeeper.

Career
MacDonald spent his early career in non-league football with Gateshead, Blyth Spartans and Torquay United. He moved to Cheltenham Town in July 2022.

Honours
Individual
Torquay United Player of the Year: 2021–22

References

1996 births
Living people
English footballers
Gateshead F.C. players
Blyth Spartans A.F.C. players
Torquay United F.C. players
Cheltenham Town F.C. players
Association football goalkeepers